Estonia–Germany relations are foreign relations between Estonia and Germany.  Germany first recognised Estonia's independence on 9 July 1921.  Both countries re-established diplomatic relations on 28 August 1991.

Estonia has an embassy in Berlin and six honorary consulates (in Düsseldorf, Hamburg, Kiel, Ludwigsburg, Leipzig and Munich).  Germany has an embassy in Tallinn.  Both countries are full members of NATO and of the European Union.

See also
Foreign relations of Estonia
Foreign relations of Germany
Baltic Germans
Baltic knighthoods
List of Baltic Germans
Deutsch-Baltische Gesellschaft

References

External links 
  Estonian Ministry of Foreign Affairs about relations with Germany
  Estonian embassy in Berlin
  German Federal Foreign Office about relations with Estonia
  German embassy in Tallinn (in Estonian and German only)

 
Bilateral relations of Germany
Germany